Kalavu (Kannada: ಕಳವು) is a 2013 Indian Kannada-language film directed by newcomer Ravi M. The film stars Umashree, Kari Subbu, Hulagappa Kattimani and others.

Cast 
 Umashree as Rangamma 
 Kari Subbu
 Hulagappa Kattimani
 Jugari Avinash as Patla 
 Shivaji Rao Jadav as Idea 
 Pramila Bengre as Thayamma 
 Bhavani Prakash as Rathni 
 Master Vaibhav

Release

Critical reception 
A critic from The Times of India wrote that "Umashree is the right choice for the role as she steals the show with her brilliant performance". B. S. Srivani from Deccan Herald wrote that "Most of the actors, led so ebulliently by Jadhav, act out their parts well, allowing the viewer to enjoy the experience thoroughly".

References

External links 
 

2010s Kannada-language films
2013 films